The 2020–21 Ardal SW season (also known as the 2020–21 Floodlighting and Electrical Services Ardal SW season for sponsorship reasons) was to be the first season of the new third-tier northern region football in Welsh football pyramid, part of the Ardal Leagues.  Teams were to play each other twice on a home and away basis.

Due to the COVID-19 pandemic in Wales, the Football Association of Wales cancelled the 2020–21 seasons of the Ardal Leagues and below.

Teams
Normally, the league is made up of 16 teams competing for one automatic promotion place to Cymru South, whilst the second place team goes into a play-off with the second place team of Ardal SE.  Three teams are relegated to tier 4. STM Sports were confirmed in the Ardal SW league by the FAW.  However, on 27 July 2020, they announced that they had folded, leaving only 15 sides in the South West league.  Cardiff Draconians were announced as the replacement team to be admitted to the league on 3 August.

Team changes

To Ardal SW
Relegated from Cymru South
 STM Sports (Folded)
 Cwmamman United
 Caerau (Ely)

From Welsh Football League Division One
 Garden Village
 Penydarren BGC
 Ton Pentre
 Pontardawe Town
 AFC Llwydcoed
 Dinas Powys

From Welsh Football League Division Two
 Ynysygerwn
 Ynyshir Albions
 Penrhiwceiber Rangers
 Pontyclun
 West End
 Treharris Athletic
 AFC Porth

From South Wales Alliance League Premier Division
 Cardiff Draconians

Stadia and locations

Source: Ardal SW Ground Information

Season overview
On 28 July 2020, the Football Association of Wales announced that this league would be named Ardal SW and would be sponsored by Floodlighting and Electrical Services.  Ardal SE & Ardal SW divisions will make up the Ardal Southern region of tier 3 in the men's Welsh domestic game.

Since anti-COVID-19 restrictions were put in place by FAW, clubs could have trained in groups of 15 and contact training was allowed at all levels of football.  However, competitive and exhibition matches were still not allowed to take place.

League table

Results

References

External links
Football Association of Wales
Ardal Southern Leagues
Ardal Southern Twitter Page
Tier 3 Rules & Regulations

2020–21 in Welsh football
Ardal Leagues
Wales